Donald Leo Mischer (born March 5, 1940) is an American producer and director of television and live events and president of Don Mischer Productions.

Career
Mischer has been honored with fifteen Emmy Awards, a record ten Directors Guild of America Awards for Outstanding Directorial Achievement, two NAACP Image Awards, a Peabody Award for excellence in broadcasting, and the 2012 Norman Lear Achievement Award in Television from the Producers Guild of America and the 2019 Directors Guild of America Lifetime Achievement Award for Television.

As a producer/director, his credits include the Oscars, We Are One: The Obama Inaugural Celebration at the Lincoln Memorial, the Kennedy Center Honors, the 100th anniversary of Carnegie Hall, Motown 25, the Super Bowl Halftime Shows (Michael Jackson, Prince, the Rolling Stones, Paul McCartney, Tom Petty, and Bruce Springsteen), the Democratic National Convention, and the Opening Ceremonies of the 1996 Summer Olympics and 2002 Winter Olympics. Mischer has also produced specials with Beyoncé, Bono, Prince, Rihanna, Britney Spears, Bruce Springsteen, James Taylor, Taylor Swift, Stevie Wonder, Sting, Garth Brooks, Mary J. Blige, Elton John, Justin Timberlake, Barbra Streisand, Cher, Yo Yo Ma, and Morgan Freeman, among others. He also presided as director over the 1975 flop, Saturday Night Live With Howard Cosell, which he blamed on the inexperience and indifference of producer Roone Arledge.

He has received the Governors Award from the National Association of Choreographers and is a member of the Event Industry Hall of Fame, the Producers Guild of America, the Directors Guild of America, and the National Academy of Television Arts and Sciences, where he has served two terms on the board of governors. As a member of the Directors Guild of America, he has served three terms on the National Board, and in 2019 received the DGA's Lifetime Achievement Award for Television. Only the fourth such award ever given for television. On December 11, 2014, Mischer received a star on the Hollywood Walk of Fame.

Personal life
Mischer was born in San Antonio, Texas, the son of Lillian and Elmer Mischer. After graduating from Douglas MacArthur High School in San Antonio, Mischer completed his education at the University of Texas Austin. He graduated with a BA degree in 1961 and with a master's degree in sociology and political science in 1963. Mischer's work took him to Washington, D.C., where he worked with the US Information Agency and Oscar-winning documentarian Charles Guggenheim.    
With his first wife Beverly, he has two children, Jennifer Christine and Heather Mischer Godsey. After 10 years in New York, he relocated to Los Angeles, where he had two children, Charles Donald and Lilly Ellison, with his wife Suzan Reed Mischer, a former CBS executive and graduate of the Rhode Island School of Design.

Accolades
Mischer has 40 Primetime Emmy nominations, with 15 Emmy wins: 13 wins through The Academy of Television Arts and Sciences, and 2 wins through the National Academy of Television Arts and Sciences.
10 Directors Guild of America Awards for Outstanding Directorial Achievement.
George Foster Peabody Award for Motown 25: Yesterday, Today, Forever.
Norman Lear Achievement Award in Television, from the Producers Guild of America (2012).
Directors Guild Lifetime Achievement Award (2019). Only the fourth such award given for Television Direction.
2 NAACP Image Awards.
Governors Award from the National Association of Choreographers.
Membership in the Event Industry Hall of Fame.
Received Star on the Hollywood Walk of Fame on December 11, 2014.
Lifetime Achievement Award from the International Cinematographers Guild

2004 Democratic National Convention
In 2004, he produced the Democratic National Convention at the FleetCenter in Boston. After John Kerry's acceptance speech, balloons were supposed to drop from the ceiling onto the delegates below. However, the balloons got stuck in the ceiling and did not fall. Mischer subsequently lost his temper with his tech crew and his profanities were aired accidentally by CNN's live broadcast.

Selected television credits

References

External links
 
 
 Crafting a Successful Career, an interview with Mischer from the University of Texas at Austin website

1940 births
American television directors
Television producers from Texas
Emmy Award winners
Living people
People from San Antonio
Douglas MacArthur High School (San Antonio) alumni
University of Texas at Austin alumni